Hexaplex cichoreum, common name the "endive murex", is a medium-sized species of sea snail, a marine gastropod mollusk in the family Muricidae, the murex shells or rock snails.

Description
The height of the oblong, fusiform shell varies between 50 mm and 150 mm. The short spire of the shell consists of eight to nine ventricose whorls that become flat-shouldered and thick with age. They are transversely ridged and striated. They show six to seven frondose varices, with the fronds elevated and  recurved. The umbilicus is rather large and deep. Its color is yellowish-brown, frequently banded with a darker tint. The fronds are usually dark brown or blackish. The white, almost round aperture has a rather long, open posterior siphonal canal that gradually widens, but is narrow  and turns to the right at the beginning. lips are tinged with pink. There is also an all-white variety (var. albicans) from the Philippines.

Distribution
This sea snail distribution is restricted to the West Pacific. Regions where it is found include Indonesia, Papua New Guinea and the Philippines.<ref name="Poutiers">{{cite book|last=Poutiers|first=J. M.|title=The living marine resources of the Western Central Pacific Volume 1. Seaweeds, corals, bivalves and gastropods|editor=Carpenter, K. E.|editor2=Niem, V. H.|publisher=FAO|location=Rome|date=1998|series=FAO Species Identification Guide for Fishery Purposes|volume=1|pages=562|chapter=Gastropods|isbn=92-5-104052-4|url=ftp://ftp.fao.org/docrep/fao/009/w7191e/w7191e50.pdf}}</ref>

References

 Merle D., Garrigues B. & Pointier J.-P. (2011) Fossil and Recent Muricidae of the world. Part Muricinae''. Hackenheim: Conchbooks. 648 pp
 
 A sinistral shell and a normal shell shown at jaxshells.org here:

Books
 Radwin, G. E. and A. D'Attilio, 1986. Murex shells of the world. An illustrated guide to the Muricidae. Stanford Univ. Press, Stanford, x + pp. 1–284 incl 192 figs. + 32 pls.

Muricidae
Gastropods described in 1791
Taxa named by Johann Friedrich Gmelin